Matot, Mattot, Mattoth, or Matos ( — Hebrew for "tribes", the fifth word, and the first distinctive word, in the parashah) is the 42nd weekly Torah portion (parashah) in the annual Jewish cycle of Torah reading and the ninth in the Book of Numbers. It comprises  It discusses laws of vows, the destruction of Midianite towns, and negotiations of the Reubanites and Gadites to settle land outside of Israel. 

The parashah is made up of 5,652 Hebrew letters, 1,484 Hebrew words, 112 verses, and 190 lines in a Torah Scroll (Sefer Torah). Jews generally read it in July or early August. The lunisolar Hebrew calendar contains up to 55 weeks, the exact number varying between 50 in common years and 54 or 55 in leap years. In some leap years (for example, 2014), parashah Matot is read separately. In most years (all coming years until 2035 in the Diaspora, until 2022 in Israel), parashah Matot is combined with the next parashah, Masei, to help achieve the number of weekly readings needed.

Readings

First reading — Numbers 30:2–17
In the first reading (aliyah), Moses told the heads of the Israelite tribes God's commands about commitments (nedarim, commonly translated, or some say mistranslated, as "vows"). If a man made a vow to God, he was to carry out all that he promised. If a girl living in her father's household made a vow to God, and her father learned of it and did not object, her vow would stand. But if her father objected on the day that he learned of it, her vow would not stand, and God would forgive her. If she married while her vow was still in force, and her husband learned of it and did not object on the day that he found out, her vow would stand. But if her husband objected on the day that he learned of it, her vow would not stand, and God would forgive her. The vow of a widow or divorced woman was binding. If a married woman made a vow and her husband learned of it and did not object, then her vow would stand. But if her husband objected on the day that he learned of it, her vow would not stand, and God would forgive her. If her husband annulled one of her vows after the day that he learned of it, he would bear her guilt.

Second reading — Numbers 31:1–12

In the second reading (aliyah), God directed Moses to attack the Midianites, after which he would die. At Moses' direction, a thousand men from each tribe, with Phinehas son of Eleazar serving as priest on the campaign with the sacred utensils and trumpets, attacked Midian and slew every man, including five kings of Midian and the prophet Balaam. The Israelites burned the Midianite towns, took the Midianite women and children captive, seized all their beasts and wealth as booty, and brought the captives and spoil to Moses, Eleazar, and the Israelite community at the steppes of Moab.

Third reading — Numbers 31:13–24
In the third reading (aliyah), Moses became angry with the army's commanders for sparing the women, as they were the ones who, at Balaam's bidding, had induced the Israelites to trespass against God in the sin of Peor. Moses then told the Israelites to kill every boy and every woman who had had sexual relations, but to spare the virgin girls. Moses directed the troops to stay outside the camp for 7 days after that, directed every one of them who had touched a corpse to cleanse himself on the third and seventh days, and directed them to cleanse everything made of cloth, hide, or wood. Eleazar told the troops to take any article that could withstand fire — gold, silver, copper, iron, tin, and lead — and pass them through fire to clean them, and to cleanse everything with the water of lustration. Eleazar directed that on the seventh day they should wash their clothes and be clean, and thereafter be free to enter the camp.

Fourth reading — Numbers 31:25–41
In the fourth reading (aliyah), God told Moses to work with Eleazar and the family heads to inventory and divide the booty equally between the combatants and the rest of the community. God told them to exact a levy for God of one item in 500 of the warriors' captive persons and animals to be given to Eleazar, and one in every 50 of the other Israelites' captive persons and animals to be given to the Levites. The total booty came to 675,000 sheep, 72,000 head of cattle, 61,000 donkeys, and 32,000 virgin women, which Moses and Eleazar divided as God had commanded.

Fifth reading — Numbers 31:42–54
In the fifth reading (aliyah), the Israelites' half of the booty came to 337,500 sheep, 36,000 head of cattle, 30,500 donkeys, and 16,000 virgin women, which Moses and Eleazar divided as God had commanded: 

The commanders of the troops told Moses that they had checked the warriors, and not one was missing, so they brought as an offering to God the gold that they came upon — armlets, bracelets, signet rings, earrings, and pendants — to make expiation for their persons before God. Moses and Eleazar accepted from them 16,750 shekels of gold, but the warriors in the ranks kept their booty for themselves.

Sixth reading — Numbers 32:1–19
In the sixth reading (aliyah), the Reubenites and the Gadites, who owned much cattle, noted that the lands of Jazer and Gilead on the east side of the Jordan River suited cattle, and they approached Moses, Eleazar, and the chieftains and asked that those lands be given to them as a holding. Moses asked them if the rest of the Israelites were to go to war while they stayed on the east bank, and would that not undermine the enthusiasm of the rest of the Israelites for crossing into the Promised Land. Moses likened their position to that of the scouts who surveyed the land and then turned the minds of the Israelites against invading, thus incensing God and causing God to swear that none of the adult Israelites (except Caleb and Joshua) would see the land. They replied that they would build their sheepfolds and towns east of the Jordan and leave their children there, but then serve as shock-troops in the vanguard of the Israelites until the land was conquered and not seek a share of the land west of the Jordan.

Seventh reading — Numbers 32:20–42
In the seventh reading (aliyah), Moses then said that if they would do this, and every shock-fighter among them crossed the Jordan, then they would be clear before God and Israel, and this land would be their holding. But Moses continued, if they did not do as they promised, they would have sinned against God.
Moses instructed Eleazar, Joshua, and the family heads of the Israelite tribes to carry out the agreement. So Moses assigned the Gadites, the Reubenites, and half the tribe of Manasseh lands on the east side of the Jordan. The Gadites and Reubenites built cities on the east side of Jordan, and some leaders of Manasseh conquered cities on the east of the Jordan so half the tribe of Manasseh could settle there.

Readings according to the triennial cycle
Jews who read the Torah according to the triennial cycle of Torah reading read the parashah according to a different schedule.

In early nonrabbinic interpretation
The parashah has parallels or is discussed in these early nonrabbinic sources:

Numbers chapter 30
The Damascus Document of the Qumran community prohited a man from annulling an oath about which he did not know whether or not it should be carried out.

In classical rabbinic interpretation
The parashah is discussed in these rabbinic sources from the era of the Mishnah and the Talmud:

Numbers chapter 30

The Mishnah taught that saying any substitute for the formulas of a vow has the validity of a vow. If one says to another, "I am barred from you by a vow," or, "I am separated from you," or, "I am removed from you, in respect of anything that I might eat of yours or that I might taste of yours," the one vowing is prohibited. Rabbi Akiva was inclined to give a stringent ruling when a person says, "I am banned to you." The Gemara taught that a vow (neder) makes a thing forbidden to a person, while an oath (shevuah) binds a person to a relationship to a thing.

Rabbi Akiva taught that vows are a fence for self-restraint. But the Jerusalem Talmud asked whether it was not enough that the Torah had forbidden us things that we should seek to forbid yet other things to ourselves. The Gemara discouraged vows. Rabbi Nathan taught that one who vows is as if he built a high place, and he who fulfils a vow is as if he sacrificed on that high place. And the Gemara deduced from Rabbi Nathan's teaching that it is meritorious to seek absolution from vows. And a Midrash told the tale of King Jannai, who owned two thousand towns, all of which were destroyed because of true oaths. A man would swear to his friend that he would eat such-and-such a food at such-and-such a place and drink such-and-such a drink at such-and-such a place. And they would go and fulfill their oaths and would be destroyed (for swearing to trifles). The Midrash concluded that if this was the fate of people who swore truthfully, how much more would swearing to a falsehood lead to destruction.

Reasoning from  “He shall not profane his word,” the Tosefta concluded that one should not treat one’s words as profane and unconsecrated. Even though there were vows that the Rabbis had ruled were not binding, the Tosefta taught that one should not make even such a vow with the plan of annulling it, as  says, “He shall not profane his word.” The Tosefta also deduced from  that even a sage could not annul his own vow for himself.

The Mishnah taught that the law of the dissolution of vows hovers in the air and has nothing on which to rest in the Biblical text. Rav Judah said that Samuel found the Scriptural basis for the law of the dissolution of vows in the words of  "he shall not break his word," which teaches that "he" — the vower — may not break the vow, but others might dissolve it for him. The Rabbis taught in a Baraita that a Sage could annul a vow retroactively.

The Sifre asked why  set forth the effectiveness of nazirite vows, when the general rule of  would suffice to teach that all vows — including nazirite vows — are binding. The Sifre explained that  warned that a person making a nazirite vow would be bound to at least a 30-day nazirite period.

Rabbah bar bar Hana told of how an Arab merchant took him to see Mount Sinai, where he saw scorpions surround it, and they stood like white donkeys. Rabbah bar bar Hana heard a Heavenly Voice expressing regret about making an oath and asking who would annul the oath. When Rabbah bar bar Hana came before the Rabbis, they told him that he should have annulled the oath. But Rabbah bar bar Hana thought that perhaps it was the oath in connection with the Flood, where in  God promised never to destroy the world again with another flood. The Rabbis replied that if that had been the oath, the Heavenly Voice would not have expressed regret.

Rava employed  to interpret  which says: "And Moses besought (va-yechal) the Lord his God" in connection with the incident of the Golden Calf. Rava noted that  uses the term "besought" (va-yechal), while  uses the similar term "break" (yacheil) in connection with vows. Similarly, Rabbi Berekiah taught in the name of Rabbi Helbo in the name of Rabbi Isaac that Moses absolved God of God's vow. When the Israelites made the Golden Calf, Moses began to persuade God to forgive them, but God explained to Moses that God had already taken an oath in  that "he who sacrifices to the gods ... shall be utterly destroyed," and God could not retract an oath. So Moses wrapped himself in his cloak and adopted the posture of a sage, and God stood before Moses as one asking for the annulment of a vow.

Rabbi Eleazar interpreted  to teach that one should not treat  lightly, because on account of it were the members of the Great Sanhedrin of Zedekiah slain. When King Jeconiah of Judah was exiled, King Nebuchadnezzar of Babylon appointed Zedekiah King of Judah (as reported in ). Zedekiah stood so high in King Nebuchadnezzar’s favor that he could enter and leave King Nebuchadnezzar’s presence without permission. One day, Zedekiah entered Nebuchadnezzar’s presence and found him tearing the flesh of a hare and eating it while it was still alive. Nebuchadnezzar asked Zedekiah to swear that he would not disclose this, and Zedekiah swore. Subsequently, the five kings over whom Nebuchadnezzar had appointed Zedekiah were sitting and sneering at Nebuchadnezzar in Zedekiah’s presence, and they told Zedekiah that the kingship did not belong to Nebuchadnezzar but to Zedekiah, as Zedekiah descended from David. So Zedekiah too sneered at Nebuchadnezzar and disclosed that once he saw him tear the flesh of a live hare and eat it. The five kings immediately told Nebuchadnezzar, who forthwith came to Antioch, where the members of the Great Sanhedrin went to meet him. Nebuchadnezzar asked them to expound the Torah to him, and they began to read it chapter by chapter. When they reached  “When a man vows a vow . . . he shall not break his word,” Nebuchadnezzar asked them whether a person could retract a vow. They replied that such a person must go to a Sage to absolve the person of the vow. Nebuchadnezzar told them that they must have absolved Zedekiah of the oath that he swore to him, and he immediately ordered them to be placed on the ground, as  reports, “They sit upon the ground, and keep silence, the elders of the daughter of Zion.” To avail them in their peril, they then began to recount the merit of Abraham, who in  said, “I am but dust and ashes”; thus  continues, “They have girded themselves with sackcloth.” They began to recount the merit of Jacob, of whom  says, “He put sackcloth upon his loins.” But Nebuchadnezzar caused the members of the Great Sanhedrin to have their hair bound to the tails of their horses as the horses were driven from Jerusalem to Lydda, killing the members of the Great Sanhedrin in the process. Thus  continues, “the virgins of Jerusalem [referring to the members of the Great Sanhedrin] hang down their heads to the ground.”

Interpreting the law of vows in  the Mishnah taught that a young child's vows were not binding. When a girl turned 11 years old and throughout the year thereafter, they examined to determine whether she was aware of the significance of her vows. The vows of a girl 12 years old or older stood without examination. When a boy turned 12 years old and throughout the year thereafter, they examined to determine whether he was aware of the significance of his vows. The vows of a boy 13 years old or older stood without examination. For girls below age 11 or boys below age 12, even if they said that they knew in honor of Whose Name they vowed, their vows and dedications were not valid. After girls turned 12 or boys turned 13, even though they said that they did not know in the honor of Whose Name they vowed, their vows and dedications stood. The Sifri Zutta told that once a youth told Rabbi Akiva that the youth had dedicated a shovel. Rabbi Akiva asked the youth whether perhaps he had sanctified his shovel to the sun or the moon. The youth replied that Rabbi Akiva did not need to worry, as the youth had sanctified it to the One Who had created them. Rabbi Akiva told the youth that his vows were valid.

The Mishnah taught that a father who did not say anything to annul his daughter's vow because he did not know that he had the power to do so could release the vow when he learned that he did have that power. Similarly, the Sages taught that a father who did not know that a statement was a vow could release that vow when he learned that it was a vow (although Rabbi Meir said that he could not).

The Sifri Zutta taught that if a father annulled his daughter's vow without her knowing that he had done so, and she deliberately transgressed the vow, she was nonetheless not liable to penalty, because  says, “the Lord will forgive her.”

Reading  “But every vow of a widow and of a divorcee . . . shall be binding on her,” the Mishnah taught that if she said, “I will be a nazirite after thirty days,” even if she married within the thirty days, her husband could not annul her vow. And if she vowed on one day, divorced on the same day, and remarried on the same day, the husband could not annul her vow. The Mishnah stated the general rule: Once she had gone into her own domain even for a single hour, her husband could not annul her vows.

The Mishnah taught that a father or husband could annul vows of self-denial (which, in the words of  "afflict the soul"), such as bathing and adorning oneself. But Rabbi Jose said that these were not vows of self-denial. Rabbi Jose taught that vows of self-denial that a father or husband could annul include if she said, "konam (that is, prohibited) be the produce of the whole world to me." Rabbi Jose taught that if she said, "konam be the produce of this country to me," he could not annul, as he could bring her to a different country. And if she said, "konam be the fruits of this shopkeeper to me," he could not annul, unless that shopkeeper was his only source of sustenance, in which case he could annul.

The Gemara deduced from the words "between a man and his wife, between a father and his daughter" in  that in addition to vows of self-denial, a husband could also annul vows that affected the relationship between husband and wife.

A Midrash taught that just as a husband could annul only vows that would cause personal affliction between the spouses, so too, a father could annul only vows that would cause personal affliction between him and his daughter.

The Mishnah taught that in the case of a betrothed young woman, her father and her fiancé could annul her vows, if they both did so. If her father but not her fiancé attempted to annul her vow, or if her fiancé but not her father attempted to annul her vow, it was not annulled. And the Mishnah taught that it went without saying that her vow was not annulled if one of them confirmed it.

The Mishnah taught that one could annul vows on the Sabbath.

Numbers chapter 31
A Midrash deduced from the proximity of the report in  that "the children of Israel took captive the women of Midian . . . and all their cattle" with the report of  that "the children of Reuben and the children of Gad had a very great multitude of cattle" that God cast the Midianites down before Israel so that the Reubenites and Gadites might grow rich. The Midrash cited this turn of events as proof of the words of Psalm  that "God is judge; He puts down one, and lifts up another."

Rather, Moses acted promptly, as  reports: "And Moses sent them." When God directed Joshua to fight against the 31 kings, however, Joshua thought that if he killed them all at once, he would die immediately thereafter, as Moses had. So Joshua dallied in the wars against the Canaanites, as  reports: "Joshua made war a long time with all those kings." In response, God shortened his life by ten years.

Phinehas the son of Eleazar the priest, to the war, with the holy vessels." But the Midrash concluded that  refers to the Ark of the Covenant, to which  refers when it says, "the service of the holy things."

Numbers chapter 32
A Midrash deduced from  that the Reubenites and Gadites were rich, possessing large amounts of cattle, but they loved their possessions so much that they separated themselves from their fellow Israelites and settled outside the Land of Israel. As a result, they became the first tribes to be taken away into exile, as 1 Chronicles  reports, "Tillegath-pilneser king of Assyria ... carried ... away ... the Reubenites, and the Gadites, and the half-tribe of Manasseh."

Similarly, a Midrash taught that the Reubenites and the Gadites cherished their property more than human life, putting their cattle before their children when they told Moses in  "We will build sheepfolds here for our cattle, and cities for our little ones." Moses told them that their priorities were wrong and that they should rather do the more important things first, when Moses told them in  "Build you cities for your little ones, and folds for your sheep." The Midrash saw in their different priorities application of the words of  "A wise man's understanding is at his right hand" — applying to Moses — and "A fool's understanding at his left" — applying to the Reubenites and the Gadites. God told the Reubenites and the Gadites that as they showed greater love for their cattle than for human souls, there would be no blessing in it for them. The Midrash thus saw in their fate application of the words of  "An estate may be gotten hastily at the beginning; but the end thereof shall not be blessed," and the words of  "Do not weary yourself to be rich; cease from your own wisdom."

In the Mishnah, Rabbi Meir noted that  and 29 stated the same condition in both positive and negative formulations.  states the condition in the positive: "And Moses said to them, if the children of Gad and the children of Reuben will pass with you over the Jordan, . . . then you shall give them the land of Gilead for a possession." And  states the same condition in the negative: "But if they will not pass over with you armed, then they shall have possessions among you in the land of Canaan." Rabbi Hanina ben Gamaliel II maintained, however, that Moses stated the matter both ways because he needed to do so to be understood; otherwise one might have concluded that the Gadites and Reubenites would receive no inheritance even in the land of Canaan.

The Mishnah taught that those who removed from the Temple coins collected in the shekel tax could not enter the chamber wearing a bordered cloak or shoes or sandals or tefillin or an amulet, lest if they became rich people might say that they became rich from money in the chamber. The Mishnah thus taught that it is one’s duty to appear to be free of blame before others as before God, as  says: “And you shall be guiltless before the Lord and before Israel.”

Similarly, the Tosefta cited  “You shall be clear before the Lord, and before Israel,” to support the proposition that while out collecting charity, charity collectors were not permitted to separate their own money from that which they collected for charity by placing their own money in a separate purse, lest it appear that they were stealing for themselves some of the money that they gathered for charity. While collecting for charity, a charity collector could not take for personal use money from a friend who owed the charity collector money, and a charity collector could not take for personal use money that the charity collector found on the road.

The Sages taught in a Baraita that they honored the memory of the family that baked the Temple showbread, for they never allowed fine bread to be found in their children's hands. And the Sages honored the memory of the family that made the Temple incense, for they never allowed a bride of their house to go about perfumed. In both cases, the families did so to fulfill the command of  that "you shall be clear before the Lord and before Israel" — meaning that people should act so as to avoid even the appearance of transgression.

Commandments

According to Maimonides
Maimonides cited a verse in the parashah for one negative commandment:
Not to transgress in matters that one has forbidden oneself

According to Sefer ha-Chinuch
According to Sefer ha-Chinuch, there is 1 positive and 1 negative commandment in the parashah. 
The precept of the law of nullifying vows
That we should not break our word in vows that we make

Haftarah
The haftarah for parashah Matot is  The haftarah is the first of three readings of admonition leading up to Tisha B'Av.

When parashah Matot is combined with parashah Masei (as it will be until 2035), the haftarah is the haftarah for parashah Masei:
for Ashkenazi Jews:  & 
for Sephardi Jews:  &

Summary
The haftarah in  begins by identifying its words as those of Jeremiah the son of Hilkiah, a priest in Anathoth in the land of Benjamin, to whom God's word came in the thirteenth year of the reign of Josiah the son of Amon as king of Judah, in the reign of Josiah's son Jehoiakim, and through the eleventh year of the reign of Josiah's son Zedekiah, when Jerusalem was carried away captive.

God's word came to Jeremiah to say that before God formed him in the womb, God knew him, sanctified him, and appointed him a prophet to the nations. Jeremiah protested that he could not speak, for he was a child, but God told him not to fear, for he would go wherever God would send him, say whatever God would command him to say, and God would be with him to deliver him. Then God touched Jeremiah's mouth and said that God had put words in his mouth and set him over the nations to root out and to pull down, to destroy and to overthrow, to build and to plant. God asked Jeremiah what he saw, he replied that he saw the rod of an almond tree, and God said that he had seen well, for God watches over God's word to perform it.

God's word came to Jeremiah a second time to ask what he saw, he replied that he saw a seething pot tipping from the north, and God said that out of the north evil would break forth upon all Israel. For God would call all the kingdoms of the north to come, and they would set their thrones at Jerusalem's gate, against its walls, and against the cities of Judah. God would utter God's judgments against Judah, as its people had forsaken God and worshipped the work of their own hands. God thus directed Jeremiah to gird his loins, arise, and speak to the Judean people all that God commanded, for God had made Jeremiah a fortified city, an iron pillar, and brazen walls against the land of Judah, its rulers, its priests, and its people. They would fight against him, but they would not prevail, for God would be with him to deliver him.

God's word came to Jeremiah to tell him to go and cry in the ears of Jerusalem that God remembered the affection of her youth, her love as a bride, how she followed God in the wilderness. Israel was God's hallowed portion and God's first-fruits, and all that devoured Israel would be held guilty and evil would come upon them.

Connection to the special Sabbath
The first of three readings of admonition leading up to Tisha B'Av, the haftarah admonishes Judah and Israel in  And then in  the haftarah concludes with consolation. The Gemara taught that Jeremiah wrote the book of Lamentations, and as Jews read Lamentations on Tisha B'Av, this probably accounts for why a selection from Jeremiah begins the series of haftarot of admonition.

Notes

Further reading
The parashah has parallels or is discussed in these sources:

Biblical
 (vow).
 (vows).
 (vows);  (vows);  (valuation of vows).
 (vows);  (trumpets);  (the spies);  (sharing with the priests and Levites);  (vow);  (Midianites).
 (Reubenites and Gadites);  (vows).
 (Reubenites and Gadites);   (Reubenites and Gadites).
 (Midianites).
1 Samuel  (vow);  (division of booty).
 (God avenges);  (paying vows);  (the righteous shall inherit the land);  (men call their lands after their own names);  (paying vows);  (washing);  (performing vows);  (value of lives);  (vengeance belongs to God);  (Peor);  (value of lives).
 (vows).

Early nonrabbinic
Josephus, Antiquities of the Jews 4:7:1, 3.  Circa 93–94. In, e.g., The Works of Josephus: Complete and Unabridged, New Updated Edition. Translated by William Whiston, pages 113–14. Peabody, Massachusetts: Hendrickson Publishers, 1987. .
Matthew  Antioch, circa 80–90 CE. (vows).
Qur'an: 2:224–226; 5:89; 9:12–13; 16:91–92, 94; 66:2 (vows).

Classical rabbinic
Mishnah: Shabbat 24:5; Chagigah 1:8; Nedarim 1:1–11:11; Gittin 4:7; Kiddushin 3:4; Shevuot 1:1–8:6; Avot 3:13. Land of Israel, circa 200 C.E. In, e.g., The Mishnah: A New Translation. Translated by Jacob Neusner, pages 330, 406–30, 492–93, 620–39, 680. New Haven: Yale University Press, 1988. .
Tosefta: Peah 4:15; Terumot 5:8; Nedarim 1:1–7:8; Sotah 7:17; Shevuot 1:1–6:7; Keritot 4:15. Land of Israel, circa 250 C.E. In, e.g., The Tosefta: Translated from the Hebrew, with a New Introduction. Translated by Jacob Neusner, volume 1, pages 73, 161, 208, 785–805, 864; volume 2, pages 1219–44, 1571. Peabody, Massachusetts: Hendrickson Publishers, 2002. .
Jerusalem Talmud: Terumot 35b; Bikkurim 6a; Shabbat 45a; Pesachim 74b; Chagigah 7a–b; Nedarim 1a–42b; Nazir 1a, 17a; Sotah 9a; Shevuot 1a–49a. Tiberias, Land of Israel, circa 400 CE. In, e.g., Talmud Yerushalmi. Edited by Chaim Malinowitz, Yisroel Simcha Schorr, and Mordechai Marcus, volumes 7, 12, 14, 19, 27, 33–34, 36, 46. Brooklyn: Mesorah Publications, 2008–2019. And in, e.g., The Jerusalem Talmud: A Translation and Commentary. Edited by Jacob Neusner and translated by Jacob Neusner, Tzvee Zahavy, B. Barry Levy, and Edward Goldman. Peabody, Massachusetts: Hendrickson Publishers, 2009. .
Genesis Rabbah 1:15; 48:10; 55:3; 85:14. Land of Israel, 5th century. In, e.g., Midrash Rabbah: Genesis. Translated by Harry Freedman and Maurice Simon, volume 1, pages 13–14, 411–12, 483–84; volume 2, page 799. London: Soncino Press, 1939. .

Babylonian Talmud: Berakhot 8b, 24a, 32a; Shabbat 16b, 58b, 60a, 63b–64a, 157a; Eruvin 63a; Pesachim 13a, 66b; Yoma 38a, 63b; Moed Katan 9a, 16a; Chagigah 10a; Yevamot 29b, 53a, 87a–b, 93a, 108a; Ketubot 40b, 46b–47a, 49a, 52a, 57b, 59a–b, 60b–61a, 70a, 71a–b, 74a, 101a, 102b; Nedarim 2a–91b; Nazir 4b, 12b, 20b, 21b, 23a, 37b, 38b, 61a, 62b; Sotah 3a, 13b, 43a; Gittin 35b, 75a, 85a; Kiddushin 3b, 61a, 78a, 81b; Bava Kamma 25b, 61a; Bava Metzia 94a, 96a; Bava Batra 2b, 120b; Sanhedrin 39a, 90a, 106a; Makkot 11a, 16a; Shevuot 2a–49b; Avodah Zarah 67b, 75b; Zevachim 97a, 113b; Menachot 77b; Chullin 25b; Arakhin 20b; Temurah 6b, 13a; Keritot 6b; Niddah 46a–b. Babylonia, 6th Century. In, e.g., Talmud Bavli. Edited by Yisroel Simcha Schorr, Chaim Malinowitz, and Mordechai Marcus, 72 volumes. Brooklyn: Mesorah Pubs., 2006.

Medieval

Rashi. Commentary. Numbers 30–32. Troyes, France, late 11th Century. In, e.g., Rashi. The Torah: With Rashi's Commentary Translated, Annotated, and Elucidated. Translated and annotated by Yisrael Isser Zvi Herczeg, volume 4, pages 369–401. Brooklyn: Mesorah Publications, 1997. .
Rashbam. Commentary on the Torah. Troyes, early 12th century. In, e.g., Rashbam's Commentary on Leviticus and Numbers: An Annotated Translation. Edited and translated by Martin I. Lockshin, pages 285–92. Providence: Brown Judaic Studies, 2001. .
Numbers Rabbah 22:1–9. 12th Century. In, e.g., Midrash Rabbah: Numbers. Translated by Judah J. Slotki, volume 6, pages 853–62. London: Soncino Press, 1939. .
Abraham ibn Ezra. Commentary on the Torah. Mid-12th century. In, e.g., Ibn Ezra's Commentary on the Pentateuch: Numbers (Ba-Midbar). Translated and annotated by H. Norman Strickman and Arthur M. Silver, pages 238–55. New York: Menorah Publishing Company, 1999. .

Maimonides. Mishneh Torah: Hilchot Sh'vuot (The Laws of Oaths) and Hilchot Nedarim (The Laws of Vows). Egypt, circa 1170–1180. In, e.g., Mishneh Torah: Sefer Hafla'ah: The Book of Utterances. Translated by Eliyahu Touger, pages 12–237. New York: Moznaim Publishing, 2003. .
Maimonides. The Guide for the Perplexed, part 1, chapter 36; part 3, chapters 39, 40. Cairo, Egypt, 1190. In, e.g., Moses Maimonides. The Guide for the Perplexed. Translated by Michael Friedländer, pages 51, 340, 344. New York: Dover Publications, 1956. .

Hezekiah ben Manoah. Hizkuni. France, circa 1240. In, e.g., Chizkiyahu ben Manoach. Chizkuni: Torah Commentary. Translated and annotated by Eliyahu Munk, volume 4, pages 1021–35. Jerusalem: Ktav Publishers, 2013. .
Nachmanides. Commentary on the Torah. Jerusalem, circa 1270. In, e.g., Ramban (Nachmanides): Commentary on the Torah: Numbers. Translated by Charles B. Chavel, volume 4, pages 344–81. New York: Shilo Publishing House, 1975. .

Zohar part 3, page 241b. Spain, late 13th Century. In, e.g., The Zohar. Translated by Harry Sperling and Maurice Simon. 5 volumes. London: Soncino Press, 1934.
Jacob ben Asher (Baal Ha-Turim). Rimze Ba'al ha-Turim. Early 14th century. In, e.g., Baal Haturim Chumash: Bamidbar/Numbers. Translated by Eliyahu Touger, edited and annotated by Avie Gold, volume 4, pages 1711–43. Brooklyn: Mesorah Publications, 2003. .
Jacob ben Asher. Perush Al ha-Torah. Early 14th century. In, e.g., Yaakov ben Asher. Tur on the Torah. Translated and annotated by Eliyahu Munk, volume 3, pages 1202–15. Jerusalem: Lambda Publishers, 2005. .
Isaac ben Moses Arama. Akedat Yizhak (The Binding of Isaac). Late 15th century. In, e.g., Yitzchak Arama. Akeydat Yitzchak: Commentary of Rabbi Yitzchak Arama on the Torah. Translated and condensed by Eliyahu Munk, volume 2, pages 791–95. New York, Lambda Publishers, 2001. .

Modern
Isaac Abravanel. Commentary on the Torah. Italy, between 1492–1509. In, e.g., Abarbanel: Selected Commentaries on the Torah: Volume 4: Bamidbar/Numbers. Translated and annotated by Israel Lazar, pages 318–24. Brooklyn: CreateSpace, 2015. .
Obadiah ben Jacob Sforno. Commentary on the Torah. Venice, 1567. In, e.g., Sforno: Commentary on the Torah. Translation and explanatory notes by Raphael Pelcovitz, pages 802–13. Brooklyn: Mesorah Publications, 1997. .

Moshe Alshich. Commentary on the Torah. Safed, circa 1593. In, e.g., Moshe Alshich. Midrash of Rabbi Moshe Alshich on the Torah. Translated and annotated by Eliyahu Munk, volume 3, pages 926–40. New York, Lambda Publishers, 2000. .
Saul Levi Morteira. “Eulogy for Moses de Mercado.” Budapest, 1652. In Marc Saperstein. Exile in Amsterdam: Saul Levi Morteira’s Sermons to a Congregation of “New Jews,” pages 536–43. Cincinnati: Hebrew Union College Press, 2005. .
Shabbethai Bass. Sifsei Chachamim. Amsterdam, 1680. In, e.g., Sefer Bamidbar: From the Five Books of the Torah: Chumash: Targum Okelos: Rashi: Sifsei Chachamim: Yalkut: Haftaros, translated by Avrohom Y. Davis, pages 534–89. Lakewood Township, New Jersey: Metsudah Publications, 2013.

Chaim ibn Attar. Ohr ha-Chaim. Venice, 1742. In Chayim ben Attar. Or Hachayim: Commentary on the Torah. Translated by Eliyahu Munk, volume 4, pages 1700–39. Brooklyn: Lambda Publishers, 1999. .
Samson Raphael Hirsch. Horeb: A Philosophy of Jewish Laws and Observances. Translated by Isidore Grunfeld, pages 276, 314–52. London: Soncino Press, 1962. Reprinted 2002 . Originally published as Horeb, Versuche über Jissroel's Pflichten in der Zerstreuung. Germany, 1837.

Samuel David Luzzatto (Shadal). Commentary on the Torah. Padua, 1871. In, e.g., Samuel David Luzzatto. Torah Commentary. Translated and annotated by Eliyahu Munk, volume 4, pages 1113–20. New York: Lambda Publishers, 2012. .
Yehudah Aryeh Leib Alter. Sefat Emet. Góra Kalwaria (Ger), Poland, before 1906. Excerpted in The Language of Truth: The Torah Commentary of Sefat Emet. Translated and interpreted by Arthur Green, pages 269–74. Philadelphia: Jewish Publication Society, 1998. . Reprinted 2012. .
Alexander Alan Steinbach. Sabbath Queen: Fifty-four Bible Talks to the Young Based on Each Portion of the Pentateuch, pages 132–35. New York: Behrman's Jewish Book House, 1936.
Julius H. Greenstone. Numbers: With Commentary: The Holy Scriptures, pages 311–37. Philadelphia: Jewish Publication Society, 1939. Reprinted by Literary Licensing, 2011. .
G. Henton Davies. “Vows.” In The Interpreter's Dictionary of the Bible, volume 4, pages 792–94. Nashville: Abingdon Press, 1962.
J. Roy Porter. "The Succession of Joshua." In Proclamation and Presence: Old Testament Essays in Honour of Gwynne Henton Davies. Edited by John I. Durham and J. Roy Porter, pages 102–32. London: SCM Press, 1970. .
Carol L. Meyers. "The Roots of Restriction: Women in Early Israel." Biblical Archaeologist, volume 41 (number 3) (September 1978).
Philip J. Budd. Word Biblical Commentary: Volume 5: Numbers, pages 320–47. Waco, Texas: Word Books, 1984. .
Pinchas H. Peli. Torah Today: A Renewed Encounter with Scripture, pages 189–93. Washington, D.C.: B'nai B'rith Books, 1987. .
Michael Fishbane. Biblical Interpretation in Ancient Israel, pages 82, 171, 258–60, 304. Oxford: Oxford University Press, 1985. .
Jacob Milgrom. The JPS Torah Commentary: Numbers: The Traditional Hebrew Text with the New JPS Translation, pages 250–77, 488–96. Philadelphia: Jewish Publication Society, 1990. .

Mark S. Smith. The Early History of God: Yahweh and the Other Deities in Ancient Israel, pages 2, 48. New York: HarperSanFrancisco, 1990. ..
Lawrence H. Schiffman. “The Law of Vows and Oaths (Num. 30, 3–16) in the ‘Zadokite Fragments’ and the ‘Temple Scroll.’” Revue de Qumrân, volume 15 (number 1/2) (57/58) (September 1991): pages 199–214.
Mary Douglas. In the Wilderness: The Doctrine of Defilement in the Book of Numbers, pages xix, 60, 86, 100, 103, 106, 108–10, 112, 120–21, 123, 126, 135, 141, 147, 160, 170–71, 183, 185–86, 199, 218, 222, 242. Oxford: Oxford University Press, 1993. Reprinted 2004. .
Judith S. Antonelli. "A Woman's Vow." In In the Image of God: A Feminist Commentary on the Torah, pages 383–91. Northvale, New Jersey: Jason Aronson, 1995. .

Ellen Frankel. The Five Books of Miriam: A Woman's Commentary on the Torah, pages 237–41. New York: G. P. Putnam's Sons, 1996. .
W. Gunther Plaut. The Haftarah Commentary, pages 407–15. New York: UAHC Press, 1996. .
Sorel Goldberg Loeb and Barbara Binder Kadden. Teaching Torah: A Treasury of Insights and Activities, pages 278–83. Denver: A.R.E. Publishing, 1997. .
Susan Freeman. Teaching Jewish Virtues: Sacred Sources and Arts Activities, pages 69–84. Springfield, New Jersey: A.R.E. Publishing, 1999. ..
Baruch A. Levine. Numbers 21–36, volume 4A, pages 423–507. New York: Anchor Bible, 2000. .
Stacy K. Offner. "Women Speak Louder Than Words." In The Women's Torah Commentary: New Insights from Women Rabbis on the 54 Weekly Torah Portions. Edited by Elyse Goldstein, pages 315–20. Woodstock, Vermont: Jewish Lights Publishing, 2000. .
Dennis T. Olson. “Numbers.” In The HarperCollins Bible Commentary. Edited by James L. Mays, pages 185–87. New York: HarperCollins Publishers, revised edition, 2000. .
Lainie Blum Cogan and Judy Weiss. Teaching Haftarah: Background, Insights, and Strategies, pages 364–73. Denver: A.R.E. Publishing, 2002. .
Michael Fishbane. The JPS Bible Commentary: Haftarot, pages 255–69. Philadelphia: Jewish Publication Society, 2002. .
Robert Alter. The Five Books of Moses: A Translation with Commentary, pages 838–51. New York: W.W. Norton & Co., 2004. .
Moshe J. Bernstein. “Women and Children in Legal and Liturgical Texts from Qumran.” Dead Sea Discoveries, volume 11 (number 2) (2004): pages 191–211.
Rachel R. Bovitz. “Haftarat Mattot: Jeremiah 1:1–2:3.” In The Women's Haftarah Commentary: New Insights from Women Rabbis on the 54 Weekly Haftarah Portions, the 5 Megillot & Special Shabbatot. Edited by Elyse Goldstein, pages 200–05. Woodstock, Vermont: Jewish Lights Publishing, 2004. .
Nili S. Fox. "Numbers." In The Jewish Study Bible. Edited by Adele Berlin and Marc Zvi Brettler, pages 343–49. New York: Oxford University Press, 2004. .
Professors on the Parashah: Studies on the Weekly Torah Reading Edited by Leib Moscovitz, pages 284–89. Jerusalem: Urim Publications, 2005. .
W. Gunther Plaut. The Torah: A Modern Commentary: Revised Edition. Revised edition edited by David E.S. Stern, pages 1099–115. New York: Union for Reform Judaism, 2006. .

Suzanne A. Brody. "Gag Rule." In Dancing in the White Spaces: The Yearly Torah Cycle and More Poems, page 101. Shelbyville, Kentucky: Wasteland Press, 2007. .
James L. Kugel. How To Read the Bible: A Guide to Scripture, Then and Now, page 64, 303, 340, 404. New York: Free Press, 2007. .
Daryl F. Jefferies. “Scripture, Wisdom, and Authority in 4QInstruction: Understanding the Use of Numbers 30:8–9 in 4Q416.” Hebrew Studies, volume 49 (2008): pages 87–98.
The Torah: A Women's Commentary. Edited by Tamara Cohn Eskenazi and Andrea L. Weiss, pages 989–1012. New York: URJ Press, 2008. .
R. Dennis Cole. "Numbers." In Zondervan Illustrated Bible Backgrounds Commentary. Edited by John H. Walton, volume 1, pages 390–95. Grand Rapids, Michigan: Zondervan, 2009. .
Lisa Edwards. “Going Ahead: Parashat Matot (Numbers 30:2–32:42).” In Torah Queeries: Weekly Commentaries on the Hebrew Bible. Edited by Gregg Drinkwater, Joshua Lesser, and David Shneer; foreword by Judith Plaskow, pages 220–23. New York: New York University Press, 2009. .
Reuven Hammer. Entering Torah: Prefaces to the Weekly Torah Portion, pages 243–47. New York: Gefen Publishing House, 2009. .
John P. Meier. "The Prohibition of Oaths." In A Marginal Jew: Rethinking the Historical Jesus: Volume Four: Law and Love, pages 182–234. New Haven: Yale University Press, 2009. .
Terence E. Fretheim. “Numbers.” In The New Oxford Annotated Bible: New Revised Standard Version with the Apocrypha: An Ecumenical Study Bible. Edited by Michael D. Coogan, Marc Z. Brettler, Carol A. Newsom, and Pheme Perkins, pages 234–39. New York: Oxford University Press, Revised 4th Edition 2010. .
The Commentators' Bible: Numbers: The JPS Miqra'ot Gedolot. Edited, translated, and annotated by Michael Carasik, pages 219–37. Philadelphia: Jewish Publication Society, 2011. .
Daniel Landes. “Choice, Commitment, Cancellation: Vows and Oaths in Jewish Law.” In All These Vows: Kol Nidre. Edited by Lawrence A. Hoffman. Woodstock, Vermont: Jewish Lights Publishing, 2011. .
Calum Carmichael. "Sexual and Religious Seduction (Numbers 25–31)." In The Book of Numbers: A Critique of Genesis, pages 135–58. New Haven: Yale University Press, 2012. .
William G. Dever. The Lives of Ordinary People in Ancient Israel: When Archaeology and the Bible Intersect, page 246. Grand Rapids, Michigan: William B. Eerdmans Publishing Company, 2012. .

Jonathan Haidt. The Righteous Mind: Why Good People Are Divided by Politics and Religion, page 256. New York: Pantheon, 2012. . (prohibition of oath-breaking as an evolutionary advantage).
Shmuel Herzfeld. "Women and Tallit." In Fifty-Four Pick Up: Fifteen-Minute Inspirational Torah Lessons, pages 238–45. Jerusalem: Gefen Publishing House, 2012. .

Shlomo Riskin. Torah Lights: Bemidbar: Trials and Tribulations in Times of Transition, pages 243–67. New Milford, Connecticut: Maggid Books, 2012. .
Francis Nataf. "The Great Educator: Moses understood that the way to correct mistakes lay in tireless and forward-thinking educational efforts." The Jerusalem Report, volume 24 (number 7) (July 15, 2013): page 47.
Erica Brown. “The only place that matters.” The Jerusalem Report, volume 24 (July 8, 2014).
Bill Rudolph. “Unifying Force: What Kind of Leader Do the Jewish People Really Want?” The Jerusalem Report, volume 26 (number 7) (July 27, 2015): page 47.

Jonathan Sacks. Lessons in Leadership: A Weekly Reading of the Jewish Bible, pages 227–31. New Milford, Connecticut: Maggid Books, 2015. .
Jonathan Sacks. Essays on Ethics: A Weekly Reading of the Jewish Bible, pages 263–67. New Milford, Connecticut: Maggid Books, 2016. .
Shai Held. The Heart of Torah, Volume 2: Essays on the Weekly Torah Portion: Leviticus, Numbers, and Deuteronomy, pages 179–90. Philadelphia: Jewish Publication Society, 2017. .
Steven Levy and Sarah Levy. The JPS Rashi Discussion Torah Commentary, pages 141–43. Philadelphia: Jewish Publication Society, 2017. .
Jonathan Sacks. Numbers: The Wilderness Years: Covenant & Conversation: A Weekly Reading of the Jewish Bible, pages 361–89. New Milford, Connecticut: Maggid Books, 2017. .

External links

Texts
Masoretic text and 1917 JPS translation
Hear the parashah chanted 
Hear the parashah read in Hebrew

Commentaries

Academy for Jewish Religion, New York
Aish.com 
Akhlah: The Jewish Children's Learning Network
Aleph Beta Academy
American Jewish University — Ziegler School of Rabbinic Studies
Anshe Emes Synagogue, Los Angeles 
Ari Goldwag
Ascent of Safed
Bar-Ilan University
Chabad.org
eparsha.com
G-dcast
The Israel Koschitzky Virtual Beit Midrash
Jewish Agency for Israel
Jewish Theological Seminary
Kabbala Online
Mechon Hadar
Miriam Aflalo
MyJewishLearning.com
Ohr Sameach
Orthodox Union
OzTorah, Torah from Australia
Oz Ve Shalom — Netivot Shalom
Pardes from Jerusalem
Professor James L. Kugel
Professor Michael Carasik 
Rabbi Fabian Werbin
Rabbi Jonathan Sacks
RabbiShimon.com 
Rabbi Shlomo Riskin
Rabbi Shmuel Herzfeld
Rabbi Stan Levin
Reconstructionist Judaism 
Sephardic Institute
Shiur.com
613.org Jewish Torah Audio
Tanach Study Center
Teach613.org, Torah Education at Cherry Hill
TheTorah.com
Torah from Dixie 
Torah.org
TorahVort.com
Union for Reform Judaism
United Synagogue of Conservative Judaism
What's Bothering Rashi?
Yeshiva University
Yeshivat Chovevei Torah

Weekly Torah readings in Av
Weekly Torah readings in Tammuz (Hebrew month)
Weekly Torah readings from Numbers